Marshala Pokryshkina is a station on the Dzerzhinskaya Line of the Novosibirsk Metro. It opened on December 28, 2000.

Novosibirsk Metro stations
Railway stations in Russia opened in 2000
Tsentralny City District, Novosibirsk
Railway stations located underground in Russia